Rahul Keni is an Indian first-class cricketer. He was part of the Goa cricket team as a wicket-keeper-batsman. He also played for the India under-19s. He scored his only first-class century in 2010 against Rajasthan at Sawai Mansingh Stadium in which he struck 20 fours in his unbeaten 115.

References

External links
 

Living people
Indian cricketers
Goa cricketers
Cricketers from Goa
Year of birth missing (living people)